The 2013 KNSB Dutch Sprint Championships in speed skating were held at the Kardinge ice stadium in Groningen, Netherlands. 
Stefan Groothuis and Margot Boer were the defending champions. Stefan Groothuis succeeded his title but Margot Boer  lost hers to Marrit Leenstra. Stefan Groothuis got his 6th Dutch Sprint Championship title.

Schedule

Medalist

Results

Men's Sprint

↓ Fell

Men's results: SchaatsStatistieken.nl

Women's Sprint

Women's results: SchaatsStatistieken.nl

References

KNSB Dutch Sprint Championships
KNSB Dutch Sprint Championships
2013 Sprint
Sports competitions in Groningen (city)